The Bank of Onslow and the Jacksonville Masonic Temple are two adjoining historic buildings located at 214 and 216 Old Bridge Street, in Jacksonville, Onslow County, North Carolina.  The buildings are in the Beaux Arts architecture and Tudor Revival architecture, and were constructed in 1916, and 1919 respectively.  They were jointly listed on the National Register of Historic Places in 1989 as a national historic district.

The Masonic Temple was originally constructed by La Fayette Lodge No. 83, A. F. & A. M. and served as their meeting hall until 1955 (when the lodge moved to new premises). It is currently used as office space by the town government.

References

External links

 Waymarking listing
 History of La Fayette Lodge No. 83, A. F. & A. M., Jacksonville, North Carolina
 Onslow County Museum

Former Masonic buildings in North Carolina
Clubhouses on the National Register of Historic Places in North Carolina
Bank buildings on the National Register of Historic Places in North Carolina
Historic districts on the National Register of Historic Places in North Carolina
Beaux-Arts architecture in North Carolina
Tudor Revival architecture in North Carolina
Masonic buildings completed in 1919
Buildings and structures in Onslow County, North Carolina
National Register of Historic Places in Onslow County, North Carolina